Hidripa is a genus of moths in the family Saturniidae first described by Max Wilhelm Karl Draudt in 1929.

Species
Hidripa albipellis Draudt, 1930
Hidripa gschwandneri Draudt, 1930
Hidripa paranensis (Bouvier, 1929)
Hidripa perdix (Maassen & Weyding, 1885)
Hidripa ruscheweyhi (Berg, 1885)
Hidripa taglia (Schaus, 1896)

References

Hemileucinae